Gabbar Singh may refer to:
Gabbar Singh (character), a character in the 1975 Indian Bollywood film Sholay
Gabbar Singh (film), a 2012 Indian Telugu language film
Gabbar Singh (field hockey) (born 1978), Canadian field hockey player
Gabar Singh Negi (1893–1915), Indian soldier and recipient of the Victoria Cross
 Gabbar Singh Gujjar, Indian dacoit
 Sardaar Gabbar Singh, a 2016 Indian Telugu language film, sequel of Gabbar Singh

Singh, Gabbar